Ariana Rodríguez (born October 21, 1990, in Carolina, Puerto Rico) is a model and a pageant titleholder who represented Carolina at the Miss Puerto Rico 2010 that was held on November 12, 2009, in San Juan. Rodriguez is majoring in finance. Ariana placed 1st Runner-Up at Miss Universe Puerto Rico 2010.

See also
 Miss Puerto Rico 2010

External links
Miss Puerto Rico Official Website

1990 births
Living people
People from Carolina, Puerto Rico
Miss Puerto Rico winners
Puerto Rican female models